Lagenophora gunniana, the coarse bottle-daisy, is a small flowering plant in the family Asteraceae native to the southeastern Australia mainland and Tasmania. The species was first formally named by Joachim Steetz in 1845.

In Victoria, it grows on plains and low hills.

References

gunniana
Flora of Australia